Willis Forko (12 November 1983 – 8 November 2021) was a Liberian professional footballer who played as a left-back.

Career

Youth and college
Although born in Liberia, Forko and his family moved to Houston, Texas when he was three years old. Willis attended Cy-Springs High School in Cypress, TX where he graduated in 2002. He began his collegiate soccer career at the University of South Carolina in 2002.  He played one season there before transferring to the University of Connecticut. At UConn he appeared in 65 matches, notching three goals and 15 assists, and was twice named to the Third Team All Big East.

Professional
Forko was selected in the second round, 14th overall, of the 2006 MLS Supplemental Draft by Real Salt Lake. He went on to play 38 games for RSL in their first two seasons in Major League Soccer, before leaving the club at the end of the 2007 season.

Forko signed with the Vancouver Whitecaps of the USL First Division in 2008, but a month after signing with the Whitecaps, it was announced that Forko had been transferred to the Norwegian Premier League side FK Bodø/Glimt. He went on to spend two seasons playing in the Tippeligaen, making 60 appearances for the team.

Forko returned to Vancouver in 2010 with hopes of joining the club in its move to the Major League Soccer in 2011. He made his first appearance for the Whitecaps on August 29, 2010 in a 2–2 tie with the Austin Aztex.

Forko died on 8 November 2021, four days before what would have been his 38th birthday.

Personal life
Forko's older brother, Sam Forko, played in Major League Soccer for the MetroStars in 2003.

References

External links
 
 

1983 births
2021 deaths
African-American soccer players
American soccer players
Association football fullbacks
Liberia international footballers
FK Bodø/Glimt players
Liberian emigrants to the United States
Major League Soccer players
Eliteserien players
Sportspeople from Monrovia
Real Salt Lake players
Soccer players from Houston
South Carolina Gamecocks men's soccer players
UConn Huskies men's soccer players
Vancouver Whitecaps (1986–2010) players
USSF Division 2 Professional League players
Real Salt Lake draft picks
American expatriate soccer players
American expatriate sportspeople in Canada
Expatriate soccer players in Canada
American expatriate sportspeople in Norway
Expatriate footballers in Norway
21st-century African-American sportspeople
20th-century African-American people